The 2021 O'Reilly Auto Parts 253 was a NASCAR Cup Series race that was held on February 21, 2021 at Daytona International Speedway in Daytona Beach, Florida.

Added as a replacement for the cancelled Auto Club 400 because of California restrictions related to the COVID-19 pandemic, the 2021 race was scheduled for 70 laps on the  road course, it was the second race of the 2021 NASCAR Cup Series season.  The race is lengthened from the 2020 schedule, where it was run at 65 laps of the course for 235 miles. It was a  race in 2021, similar to the Charlotte and Road America road course races.

Chicane issues

During the Busch Clash, track visibility issues came after a safety car situation was called on Lap 9 of the first segment of 15 laps with excessive mud and dirt at the exit of the bus stop on the backstretch.  The mud and dirt led to Kevin Harvick spinning early in the race, visibility issues, and later in the race, leader Martin Truex Jr. caused a safety car by crashing at the exit after overdriving the chicane and losing traction from the mud that had accumulated during the race.

A social media post by Denny Hamlin confirmed on February 16 that additional work was being done in the bus stop kerbing, with officials planning to add "sausage kerbing" (also known as "turtles") to the chicane as used in the front stretch chicane in the bus stop to prevent drivers from short-cutting the chicane and throwing mud on the circuit.

Entry list
 (R) denotes rookie driver.
 (i) denotes driver who are ineligible for series driver points.

Starting Lineup
Chase Elliott was awarded the pole for the race. This is the first of 28 scheduled one-day races using the competition-based formula from the 2020 season that began with last year's road course race based on owner point standings (35%) and from the previous round, the car's fastest lap (15%) and finishing position (driver's for 25% and owner's for 25%;  41st position is used in the average if the driver or owner did not participate in the previous race).

Race
The seventy lap race was won by Joe Gibbs Racing driver Christopher Bell in a Toyota. A safety car period was called for rain which bunched the pack up, but the leaders changed onto dry tires rather than rain tires. Another caution period was called because Tyler Reddick's car caught fire. Bell claimed the lead when he overtook Joey Logano on the penultimate lap. It was Bell's first Cup Series victory. It was the first time since the 1950 NASCAR Grand National Series that a year's opening brace of races had maiden winners. Bell's teammate Hamlin finished in third behind Logano. Polesitter Elliott led most of the race but span after a collision with Kurt Busch and came 21st. Busch finished fourth ahead of Brad Keselowski. Both drivers gained positions by not making additional pit stops. Before this, Busch had fallen down the order after he span while leading, while Keselowski had also made mistakes. Harvick followed Keselowski, while A. J. Allmendinger took Kaulig Racing's best Cup Series result in seventh. Michael McDowell, who had won the 2021 Daytona 500 a week prior, recovered from a lap one puncture to finish eighth. Kyle Larson and Kyle Busch were both in the top five in the final twenty laps, but Larson spun into a tire barrier coming out of turn 7 and finished 30th, while Busch's team made a strategic error and was involved in a minor crash with Chris Buescher, finishing 35th.

Bell said he was "not overly shocked", but felt that "to win the first road course of the year is quite surprising". He also said that he "certainly knew we would be in contention or at least competitive today." He expressed the view that road racing "showcases talent".

The caution flag flown for rain during the last stage of the race was criticized as an "entertainment" caution, due to the surface being not being considered too wet to continue racing, as well as also altering the finish of the race preventing Elliott (who, alongside Kyle Busch, questioned the caution over the radio on NASCAR Race Hubs Radioactive segment, the show's team radio chatter highlights) from walking away easily with a win.  The race had been declared a dry race at the start.  Had the start been declared a wet race (teams must start on rain tires), NASCAR would not call a safety car situation if it dries, and rains again.  NASCAR changed rules in 2022 where, if a race was declared a dry race to start, a safety car is no longer automatically implemented when rain becomes an issue to prevent this situation.

Stage ResultsStage OneLaps: 16Stage TwoLaps: 18

Final Stage ResultsStage Three'''Laps:'' 36

Race statistics
 Lead changes: 12 among 7 different drivers
 Cautions/Laps: 8 for 12
 Red flags: 0
 Time of race: 2 hours, 59 minutes and 32 seconds
 Average speed:

Media

Television
Fox Sports televised the race in the United States on Fox. Mike Joy, six-time Daytona winner Jeff Gordon and Clint Bowyer called the race from the broadcast booth. Jamie Little and Regan Smith handled pit road for the television side. Larry McReynolds provided insight from the Fox Sports studio in Charlotte.

Radio
MRN had the radio call for the race, which was also simulcast on Sirius XM NASCAR Radio.

Standings after the race

Drivers' Championship standings

Manufacturers' Championship standings

Note: Only the first 16 positions are included for the driver standings.

References

NASCAR races at Daytona International Speedway
O'Reilly Auto Parts 253
O'Reilly Auto Parts 253
O'Reilly Auto Parts 253